Acoutsina ( 1697 – after 1719), was an Inuit from Labrador who was enslaved by Augustin le Gardeur de Courtemanche. During her captivity she taught François Martel de Brouague, his stepson and a French colonist and commandant of the coast of Labrador, the language of her people, while she learned French. After a few years in captivity, her father came to the fort and secured her release. Historians analyse records of her captivity for information on French-Indigenous relationships.

Heritage and family

It is difficult to ascertain the heritage of Acoutsina due to the limited information that exists from this area at this period in history. The French adopted the term "Eskimo" from the indigenous people in North America, but their use of the word referred to several Nordic Amerindian groups in the area, including the Naskapi and the Beothuk, who are not part of the Eskimo group. Jacques Rousseau, a professor of ethnobiology, asserts that Acoutsina was part of the Eskimo people and not Naskapi or Beothuk, due to the translation of her name from the Eskimo language, her instruction of the Eskimo language to children, and the Eskimo cultural practices that she is recorded to have demonstrated. 

Acoutsina's father was Ouibignaro, a chief of the Inuk people. She described Eskimo customs and legends to the Europeans.

Capture

French ports on the Strait of Belle Isle were established by the early 18th century and they hoped to develop positive relationships with the local indigenous communities to enhance the fur trade. The commandant at the Baie de Phélypeaux, Augustin Le Gardeur de Courtemanche, met with the Eskimos in the fall of 1716 and convinced them to return the following spring to trade furs. The Eskimos returned the following May and camped near the fort. Courtemanche tried to extort the indigenous group, threatening to shoot at them, so the Eskimos retreated to their boats and shot arrows at the French. The French grabbed a boat and pulled four people from the boat, including Acoutsina.

Captivity

Acoutsina was kept at the fort as deterrence against Indigenous attacks. One month after her capture, de Courtemanche died and his stepson, Brouague, took over the commandant position for the fort. Acoutsina was placed under the care of Courtemanche's wife, and Acoutsina later recounted to Eskimo people that she was always near Madame Courtemanche, who protected Acoutsina from harm. Acoutsina taught the Eskimo language to Brouague and was tasked with domestic work. Information about Acoutsina is found in letters written by Brouague. He wrote that Acoutsina desired to return to her family in 1718.  

While living in the port Acoutsina learned some French and described Eskimo traditions, mythology, and legends. She also described how Europeans integrated into the Eskimo group, including a shipwrecked sailor that the Eskimos called "good old Nicolas".

Release

In September 1719, the Eskimos came to Île aux Bois. Brouague went to meet with the Eskimos and brought Acoutsina with him. After the meeting, Ouibignaro, who was Acoutsina's father, and 30 Eskimos travelled with Brouague and Acoutsina back to the fort to attend a feast. In the fort, Acoutsina demonstrated aspects of the Catholic mass for the indigenous people. Ouibignaro asked for Acoutsina and the other girl who was captured with Acoutsina to be returned to the Eskimo people; Brouague obliged. Acoutsina was given gifts and food from Madame Courtmanche.

Another chief among the Eskimo people, Camerlique, declared that Acoutsina the French should be killed. Acoutsina was distressed over this declaration and she was reassured that this would not happen. Instead, the Eskimos promised not to stop burning the French fishermen's ships. The fort's chaplain gave Acoutsina a book so that she could demonstrate her knowledge of the French language to her people. She departed with the indigenous people, and there are no further records of her.

Legacy

After leaving, Acoutsina and the Eskimos did not return to the French fort and continued to destroy French boats.  

Records of Acoutsina's statements have allowed historians to analyse the diplomatic relationship between the Eskimo people and Europeans in the sixteenth century.

Notes

References

Further reading

See also
 List of people of Newfoundland and Labrador

1690s births
18th-century deaths
Year of birth uncertain
Year of death unknown
Canadian Inuit women
Canadian slaves
People from Labrador
People of New France
Inuit from Newfoundland and Labrador